Emma Rendel, born 1976 in Uppsala, is a Swedish graphic novel author, artist and illustrator who lives and works in Stockholm.

Emma Rendel studied Illustration at Central St Martins and Communication Arts and Design at the Royal College of Art in London. Her graphic stories have been published in magazines such as Galago, Icon magazine, Le Gun and Art Review, and her illustrations have been used by: Time Out, Form and Battersea Arts Centre. Rendel has participated in various exhibitions including COMICA at the Institute of Contemporary Arts, London, 2008 and Cut my legs off and call me shorty! at Tensta Konsthall, 2009.
She is currently teaching illustration in a Visual Communications course at Konstfack University College of Art and Design. 
 
Rendel is credited with coining the term "awkwardist" in an article by Paul Gravett, originally published in Art Review, London.
This term coincides with the theme of "social awkwardness leading to sinister repercussion"  that she achieves throughout all of her short graphic novels.

Books 
 The Vicar Woman (Published by Jonathan Cape, London, 2012)()
 Allt Är Allrajt (Published by Kartago Förlag, Stockholm, 2009)(Swedish language)()
 Pentti and Deathgirl (Published by Jonathan Cape, London, 2009)()
 The Awkwardists (Self published, London, 2006)
 Deathgirls Birthday (Self published, London, 2005)
 Deathgirls Diary 2 (Self published, London, 2005)
 Deathgirls Diary 1 (Self published, London, 2005)

References

External links 
 www.randomhouse.co.uk Author page at Random House
 www.legun.co.uk Le Gun magazine
 www.kartago.se Kartago Förlag, Publishers (site in Swedish)
  Interview with Foggy Grizzly (site in Swedish)
  Emma Rendel website (site in English and Swedish)
 

1976 births
Living people
Alumni of Central Saint Martins
Alumni of the Royal College of Art
Swedish female comics artists
Female comics writers
People from Uppsala
Swedish cartoonists
Swedish women cartoonists